"Mein" (German for either "mine" or "my") is the second single from the American alternative metal band Deftones' fifth album, Saturday Night Wrist, and their 11th single overall. The song featured Serj Tankian of System of a Down on vocals. The single was released on March 13, 2007. It is also the band's last single recorded with their bassist Chi Cheng before his serious automobile crash in the following year and before his death in 2013.

Background
In a later interview on Reddit, Tankian was asked how the collaboration had come about, replying: "Chino asked and I obliged :) We´ve all been friends and toured together for many years"

Reception
Calling the song an "industrial banger with swooshy space-rock overlays," Rolling Stone writer Christian Hoard favorably compared Chino Moreno's vocal style to that of Thom Yorke. Conversely, NME panned "Mein," writing: "This song reminds us of when we used to have MTV2 and had to switch to VH1 Classic every time Back To School came on, or we’d get a headache. Boooooring."

"Mein" garnered little radio play and subsequently failed to chart significantly on American rock charts, peaking at number 40 on the US Mainstream Rock Tracks chart.

Music video
During the week of January 20, 2007, the band filmed a music video for "Mein", which was subsequently leaked to YouTube on March 2. Directed by Bernard Gourley, the video depicted hip hop influences and breakdancers, while the band performed on top of a parking structure with the Los Angeles skyline in the background.

Track listing

References

External links

Deftones songs
2007 singles
Songs written by Chino Moreno
Songs written by Chi Cheng (musician)
Songs written by Abe Cunningham
Songs written by Serj Tankian
Songs written by Shaun Lopez
Maverick Records singles
2006 songs
Songs written by Stephen Carpenter
Songs written by Frank Delgado (American musician)
Space rock songs